Liturgical Latinisation is the process of adoption of Latin liturgical rites by non-Latin Christian denominations, particularly within Eastern Catholic liturgy. Throughout history, liturgical Latinisation was manifested in various forms. In Early Middle Ages, it occurred during the process of conversion of Gothic Christianity, and also during the process of reincorporation of Celtic Christianity. During the Crusades, it was introduced to Eastern Christians. After the creation of various Eastern Catholic Churches, several forms and degrees of liturgical Latinisation were adopted by some of those Churches, in order to make their liturgical customs resembling more closely the practices of the Roman Rite of the Catholic Church.

This particular process continued up to the 18th and 19th centuries, until it was forbidden by Pope Leo XIII in 1894 with his encyclical Orientalium dignitas. Latinisation is a contentious issue in many churches and has been considered responsible for various schisms.

In recent years the Eastern Catholic churches have been returning to ancient Eastern practices in accord with the Second Vatican Council's decree Orientalium Ecclesiarum.  The decree mandated that authentic Eastern Catholic practices were not to be set aside in favour of imported Latin practices. This further encouraged the movement to return to authentic Eastern liturgical practice, theology and spirituality. Implementation has varied amongst the Eastern Catholic Churches, however, with some remaining more Latinised than the others.

In a somewhat similar development, practices once associated only with the West, such as polyphonic choirs, icons in the style of the Western Renaissance, as in the Cretan School of painting, or even of the Baroque period, and pews, have been adopted also in certain Eastern Orthodox and Oriental Orthodox churches and are today the object of controversy or have been abandoned.

See also
The Courage To Be Ourselves, Eastern Catholic pastoral letter addressing Latinisation

References

Sources

Further reading

External links
Latinisation and De-latinisation in the Melkite Catholic Church , found in Chapter 2 of Bearers of Mysteries
Orientalium dignitas

Catholic theology and doctrine
Catholic liturgy
History of Eastern Catholicism
Catholic devotions
Catholic liturgical law
Latin Church